Liam Dower Nilsson (born 14 April 2003) is a Swedish professional ice hockey centre currently playing for Frölunda HC of the Swedish Hockey League (SHL). He was selected 134th overall by the Detroit Red Wings in the 2021 NHL Entry Draft.

Playing career
Dower Nilsson made his professional debut for Frölunda HC during the 2020–21 season. He appeared in five games, and received a game misconduct penalty for high-sticking in his SHL debut.

Dower Nilsson was drafted in the fifth round, 134th overall, by the Detroit Red Wings in the 2021 NHL Entry Draft.

International play

Dower Nilsson served as captain of Sweden at the 2021 IIHF World U18 Championships, where he recorded one goal and three assists in seven games, and won a bronze medal.

Career statistics

Regular season and playoffs

International

References

External links
 

2003 births
Living people
Detroit Red Wings draft picks
Frölunda HC players
Ice hockey people from Gothenburg
Swedish ice hockey centres